Peter Sís (born Petr Sís; May 11, 1949) is a Czech-born American illustrator and writer of children's books. As a cartoonist his editorial illustrations have appeared in Time, Newsweek, Esquire, and The Atlantic Monthly. For his "lasting contribution" as a children's illustrator he received the Hans Christian Andersen Medal in 2012.

Background 
Peter Sís was born in Brno, Czechoslovakia in 1949. His father was a filmmaker and his mother was an artist. He is the oldest of three siblings, has a younger sister Hana and younger brother David, who became a film director after his father.  As a teenager, Sís developed an interest in Western culture, Allen Ginsberg's beat poetry, long hair for men, blue jeans and rock and roll, particularly the music of The Beatles, The Beach Boys and The Rolling Stones. Sís was educated at The High School of Applied Arts, the Academy of Applied Arts in Prague and the Royal College of Art in London, where he studied with Quentin Blake.  When he graduated, he began a career as a filmmaker, later winning a Golden Bear Award for an animated short, Hlavy, at the 1980 West Berlin Film Festival.

Sís travelled to the United States in 1982 "to create an animated film based on Czechoslovakia's participation in the Olympics" that were upcoming in Los Angeles. The Soviet Union initiated a boycott that included Czechoslovakia but Sís did not return home. He remained in America and was granted asylum. In the U.S. he began illustrating and writing books. He has occasionally returned to filmmaking, producing commercials for Nickelodeon & PBS Kids, plus shorts for Sesame Street based on his book Madlenka.

Sís became a U.S. citizen in 1988.

Awards

Peter Sís has won The New York Times Book Review Best Illustrated Book of the Year award seven times. He has also been awarded with the American Library Association's Caldecott Honor for the illustrations of his 1996 book, Starry Messenger, the 1998 book Tibet Through The Red Box, and his 2007 work, The Wall: Growing Up Behind the Iron Curtain. The latter book also received the ALA's 2008 Robert Silbert Medal for the most distinguished informational book for young readers. He has received a Boston Globe–Horn Book Award four times: for Komodo (1993), A Small Tall Tale From the Far Far North (1994), Tibet Through The Red Box (1999), and The Wall: Growing Up Behind the Iron Curtain (2008).

He won the Deutscher Jugendliteraturpreis for Tibet Through the Red Box. He also won the MacArthur Fellowship Award in 2003.

Sís has won the Golden Bear Award at the 1980 Berlin International Film Festival for an animated short.  He has also won the Grand Prix Toronto and the Cine Golden Eagle Award.

The biennial Hans Christian Andersen Award conferred by the International Board on Books for Young People is the highest recognition available to a writer or illustrator of children's books. Sís received the illustration award in 2012.

On July 15, 2014, Sís was announced as a finalist for the prestigious 2015 NSK Neustadt Prize for Children's Literature.

Works

Rainbow Rhino (1987)
Waving (1988)
Going Up! (1989)
Beach Ball (1990)
 Follow the Dream: The Story of Christopher Columbus (1991)
An Ocean World (1992)
 Komodo! (1993)
A Small Tall Tale from the Far Far North (1993)
 The Three Golden Keys (1994)
 Starry Messenger: ... Galileo Galilei (1996)
 Fire Truck (1998)
 Tibet: Through the Red Box (1998)
 Trucks, Trucks, Trucks (1999)
Ship Ahoy! (1999)
 Madlenka (2000)
Dinosaur (2000)
Ballerina (2001)
Madlenka's Dog (2002)
 The Tree of Life: ... Charles Darwin ... (2003)
 The Train of States (2004)
Play, Mozart, Play (2006)
 The Wall: Growing Up Behind the Iron Curtain (2007)
Madlenka Soccer Star (2010)
The Conference of the Birds (2011)
The Pilot and the Little Prince (2014)
Ice Cream Summer (2015)
Nicky & Vera: A Quiet Hero of the Holocaust and the Children He Rescued (2021)

As illustrator only

 Stories to Solve: folktales from around the world (1985), by George Shannon
 The Whipping Boy (1986), by Sid Fleischman
 The Scarebird (1987), Fleischman
 The Midnight Horse (1990), Fleischman
 More Stories to Solve: fifteen folktales from around the world (1990), Shannon
 The Dragons Are Singing Tonight (1993), by Jack Prelutsky
 Still More Stories to Solve: fourteen folktales from around the world (1994), Shannon
 The 13th Floor: a ghost story (1995), Fleischman
 Le marchand d'ailes (1997), by Jacques Taravant (The Little Wing Giver, 2001)
 The Gargoyle on the Roof (1999), poems by Prelutsky
 Monday's Troll (1996), Prelutsky
 Scranimals (2002), Prelutsky
 The Book of Imaginary Beings (2006), by Jorge Luis Borges
 The Dream Stealer (2009), Fleischman
 The Dreamer (2010), by Pam Muñoz Ryan —about Pablo Neruda

See also

 Amnesty-Sís-Pinton Tapestries

References

External links

 
Peter Sís's public artwork at the 86th Street station, commissioned by MTA Arts for Transit.
CBS Interview with Peter Sís
Review of The Wall by Leonard S. Marcus, The New York Times
Peter Sís at publisher HarperCollins
Peter Sís at publisher Macmillan US
Parent's Choice: Peter Sís biography
Velinger, Jan; Peter Sís - illustrator & author of magnificent children's books; Radio Praha; 15 September 2004
 
 
Interview with Peter Sis about his illustrations, All About Kids! TV Series #189 (1994)

1949 births
Czech children's writers
Czech illustrators
Czechoslovak emigrants to the United States
Hans Christian Andersen Award for Illustration winners
MacArthur Fellows
Alumni of the Royal College of Art
Writers from Brno
Living people
Artists from Brno
Film people from Brno
Naturalized citizens of the United States
Robert F. Sibert Informational Book Medal winners